Dennis Parker (born March 23, 1950) is an American football coach.  He served as the head football coach at the University of North Texas from 1991 to 1993 and at Texas Lutheran University from 2007 to 2009, compiling a career college football record of 17–45–1.

Parker began his coaching career in the high school ranks as an assistant at San Antonio Edison, San Antonio Holmes and Converse Judson. At Converse Judson, Parker was the offensive coordinator under coach Frank Arnold, as the team won the 1983 state championship. In 1984, he took over head coaching duties at Marshall, guiding the school to a 56–27–1 record in seven years. In 1990, his team won a state championship versus Converse Judson. Parker was named the Texas High School Coach of the Year in 1988 and in 1990.

Moving into the collegiate ranks, Parker succeeded Corky Nelson at North Texas in 1991. He left in 1993 after three losing seasons. He later coached at Cleburne and Mesa before becoming head coach at Texas Lutheran.  On November 9, 2009, Parker resigned as head coach at Texas Lutheran, where he had three more losing seasons.

Head coaching record

College

References

1950 births
Living people
North Texas Mean Green football coaches
Southeast Missouri State Redhawks football coaches
Southeastern Oklahoma State Savage Storm football players
Texas Lutheran Bulldogs football coaches
High school football coaches in Oklahoma
High school football coaches in Texas
People from Idabel, Oklahoma